The EMD GP40-2 is a 4-axle diesel locomotive built by General Motors Electro-Motive Division as part of its Dash 2 line between April 1972 and December 1986. The locomotive's power is provided by an EMD 645E3 16-cylinder engine which generates .

Production 
Standard GP40-2 production totaled 861 units, with 817 built for U.S. railroads, and 44 for Mexican railroads. In addition, three GP40P-2s, passenger versions of the GP40-2, were built in 1974 and 279 were built by General Motors Diesel (GMD) between 1974 and 1976. Total production of the GP40-2 and its variations totaled 1,143 units.

Performance 
With the 62:15 gearing (65-70 mph maximum) EMD rated the GP40-2 at 55,400 lb continuous tractive effort. Some had PF21 module that reduced the output below 23 mph, lowering continuous speed down to 11 mph.

Original buyers 

GP40-2LW

GP40P-2

Preservation 

Sonora Baja California 2107 is now preserved in a Museum in Mexicali, MX

See also 
List of GM-EMD locomotives
List of GMD Locomotives

References

External links 

 Sarberenyi, Robert. EMD GP40-2, GP40-2W, and GP40-2LW, GP40P-2 Original Owners
 CN GP40 Family
 GP40-2 order numbers
 EMD GP40-2 Proto Info: Conrail Cyclopedia

Diesel-electric locomotives of the United States
Diesel-electric locomotives of Canada
GP40-2
GP40-2
B-B locomotives
Railway locomotives introduced in 1972
Standard gauge locomotives of the United States
Standard gauge locomotives of Mexico
Standard gauge locomotives of Canada
Diesel-electric locomotives of Mexico